In ancient Roman religion, Rumina, also known as Diva Rumina, was a goddess who protected breastfeeding mothers, and possibly nursing infants. Her domain extended to protecting animal mothers, not just human ones. As one of the indigitamenta, Rumina lacked the elaborate mythology and personality of later Roman deities, and was instead a more abstract, numinous entity.

Rumina's temple was near the Ficus Ruminalis, the fig tree at the foot of the Palatine Hill where Romulus and Remus were raised by a she-wolf. Milk, rather than the typical wine, was offered as a sacrifice at this temple. In AD 58, the tree started to die, which was interpreted as a bad omen.

References
 Hammond, N.G.L. & Scullard, H.H. (Eds.) (1970). The Oxford Classical Dictionary (p. 940). Oxford: Oxford University Press. .

Roman goddesses
Childhood goddesses
Animal goddesses
Childhood in ancient Rome